Roger Federer was the defending champion but lost in the first round to Franco Squillari.

Lee Hyung-taik won his first (and only) ATP Tour title, defeating Juan Carlos Ferrero in the final, 4–6, 7–6(8–6), 7–6(7–4). Lee became the first South Korean player to win the ATP title.

Seeds
A champion seed is indicated in bold text while text in italics indicates the round in which that seed was eliminated.

  Marat Safin (quarterfinals)
  Juan Carlos Ferrero (final)
  Carlos Moyá (second round)
  Roger Federer (first round)
  Albert Costa (first round)
  Andy Roddick (second round)
  Paradorn Srichaphan (quarterfinals)
  Gastón Gaudio (second round)

Draw

External links
 2003 Adidas International Draw
 2003 Adidas International Singles Qualifying Draw

Men's Singles
Singles